Afrosataspes is a genus of moths in the family Sphingidae, containing only one species, Afrosataspes galleyi, which is known from the Central African Republic and the Democratic Republic of the Congo.

References

Smerinthini
Monotypic moth genera
Moths of Africa
Insects of the Central African Republic